Andrew Meiklejohn FRCP (1899 – 27 October 1970) was a Scottish respiratory physician, who entered the tuberculosis service, first in Sheffield and subsequently in Manchester, before studying lead poisoning and silicosis in the pottery trade. In 1963 he gave the Milroy Lecture.

References 

1899 births
1970 deaths
Fellows of the Royal College of Physicians
Medical doctors from Glasgow
20th-century English medical doctors
Alumni of the University of Glasgow